Kalyssa "Kiki" van Zanten (born 25 August 2001) is a Jamaican footballer who plays as a forward for Notre Dame Fighting Irish and the Jamaica women's national team.

Early life
Van Zanten was born to an American father of Dutch descent and a Jamaican mother.

International career 
Van Zanten made her senior debut in a 4–0 CONCACAF Women's World Cup Qualifiers win against Bermuda on 17 February 2022. She came on in the 63rd minute to replace Trudi Carter. She was named in the 2022 CONCACAF W Championship final squad and represented Jamaica at the 2022 CONCACAF W Championship. On 18 July 2022 she scored her debut goal, a winner against Costa Rica to grant Jamaica a third place finish in the competition.

Honours 
United States U15

 CONCACAF Girls' U-15 Championship: 2016

Jamaica

 CONCACAF Women's Championship third place: 2022

References

External links 
 

2001 births
Living people
Citizens of Jamaica through descent
Jamaican women's footballers
Women's association football forwards
Jamaica women's international footballers
Jamaican people of American descent
Jamaican people of Dutch descent
People from Buffalo Grove, Illinois
Sportspeople from the Chicago metropolitan area
Soccer players from Illinois
American women's soccer players
Notre Dame Fighting Irish women's soccer players
American people of Dutch descent
American sportspeople of Jamaican descent
African-American women's soccer players